The Diocese of Atri (Latin: Dioecesis Hatriensis seu Atriensis) was a Roman Catholic diocese located in the town of Atri in the Province of Teramo in the Abruzzo region of Italy. In 1252, it was united with the Diocese of Penne to form the Diocese of Penne e Atri.

See also
Catholic Church in Italy

References

Former Roman Catholic dioceses in Italy